Amenooshihomimi (天之忍穂耳命) or Oshihomimi for short, is the first son of Amaterasu.

He is believed to be the ancestor to the Japanese imperial family.

Name and Etymology 
Amenooshihomimi name means (Ruling Rice Ears of Heaven) he also goes by other names like Masakatsu-akatsukachi-hayahi-ame-no-oshihomimi which means (Truly Winning Have I Won with Rushing Might Ruling Grand Rice Ears of Heaven)

Mythology

Birth 

He was born out of a kami making competition between Amaterasu and Susanoo.

In many versions, Susanoo took Amaterasu's beads and crushed them within his mouth, which created five male kami. The first one to be born was Amenooshihomimi, second was Ame-no-hohi, third was Amatsuhikone, fourth was Ikutsuhikone, and Kumanokusubi was the fifth.

Offer to rule 
In some versions, Amaterasu gave Amenooshihomimi a bronze mirror and this mirror, called Yata no Kagami. In many versions, Amenooshihomimi is the first to be offered as the ruler of earth however, he turns it down.

He fell in love with Takuhadachiji-hime, and then later on fathered Ninigi-no-Mikoto.

Worship 
The shrine nogami-jinja is dedicated to Oshihomimi and his wife.

See also 
 Kuni-yuzuri

References 

Japanese gods
Shinto kami
Amatsukami